Mertanen is a Finnish surname. Notable people with the surname include:

 Martti Mertanen (1925–2001), Finnish artist and educator
 Terhi Mertanen (born 1981), Finnish ice hockey player and coach

Finnish-language surnames